Bibiano Fernandes (born 2 December 1976 in Mapusa, Goa) is an Indian football manager and former football player who is currently the coach of India under-16 national football team. Under his coaching India won SAFF under-15 championship in 2017 and 2019. India U16 had also reached the 2018 AFC U-16 Championship Quarter finals eventually losing out to South Korea U16 in his reign. He is regarded as one of the great coaches in India. Under his tenure, India qualified for AFC Under-16 Championship for two times, which is India's ninth appearance in the Championship.

References

External links
 
 Profile at Goal.com

1976 births
Living people
Indian footballers
Churchill Brothers FC Goa players
Dempo SC players
Vasco SC players
Sporting Clube de Goa players
East Bengal Club players
Footballers from Goa
I-League players
India international footballers
Association football midfielders
People from Mapusa
Indian football managers
Indian football coaches